This is a list of public art in the London Borough of Bexley.

Belvedere

Bexley

Bexleyheath

Crayford

Erith

North Cray

Sidcup

References

External links
 

Bexley
Public art
Public art